Woodhaven may refer to:

United Kingdom
 Woodhaven, Fife, a small settlement in northeast Fife, Scotland

United States
 Woodhaven, Fort Worth, Texas, a neighborhood
 Woodhaven, Michigan, a city
 Woodhaven, Queens, New York, a neighborhood
 Woodhaven Lakes, a private camping resort in Sublette, Illinois